Falkner may refer to:

People with the surname 
 Adam Falkner (author), American author
 Allen Falkner (born 1969), American artist
 Brian Falkner (author) (born 1962), popular New Zealand children's author
 Brian Falkner, common misspelling of the name of Brian Faulkner, Baron Faulkner of Downpatrick (1921–1977), Prime Minister of Northern Ireland
 Elizabeth Falkner, American Pastry Chef
 Frank Falkner, British-born American biologist and pediatrician
 Harold Falkner, early 20th-century British architect
 Jason Falkner (born 1968), American pop and rock musician
 J. Meade Falkner (1858–1932), English novelist and poet, best known for his 1898 novel, Moonfleet
 Keith Falkner (1900–1994), English bass-baritone singer
 Kelly Falkner (born 1960), American chemical oceanographer and educator
 Kishwer Falkner, Baroness Falkner of Margravine (born 1955), British politician
 Maria Smith-Falkner (1878–1968), Russian economist
 Monica Falkner, New Zealand netball player
 Nick Falkner (born 1962), English cricketer
 Peter Falkner (fl. 1470–1480), German fencing master
 Thomas Falkner (1707–1784), English missionary
 William Falkner (disambiguation), any of several people of the same name

Fictional characters 
 Dick Falkner, protagonist of the 1902–03 novel That Printer of Udell's by Harold Bell Wright
 Falkner (Pokémon), a character in the Pokémon universe

Places 
 Falkner, Mississippi, a town in the United States
 Falkner Island, in Long Island Sound off Connecticut, United States
 Falkner Island Light, a lighthouse on Falkner Island, Connecticut, United States
 Falkner Square, a square in Liverpool, England, United Kingdom
 Falkner Glacier, a glacier in Victoria Land, Antarctica

Literature 
 Falkner (novel), a 19th-century novel by Mary Shelley

See also 
 Falconer (disambiguation)
 Faulkner (disambiguation)
Faulconer (surname)
 Faulknor (disambiguation)
 Fawkner (disambiguation)